is a stable of sumo wrestlers, part of the Dewanoumi group of stables. It was established in its modern form on 25 May 1998 by former komusubi Ryōgoku Kajinosuke IV, who branched off from Dewanoumi stable. It was originally called Nakadachi stable, but when Sakaigawa-oyakata (the 50th yokozuna Sadanoyama) reached the Japan Sumo Association's mandatory retirement age in February 2003, he passed on the Sakaigawa name, and the stable was renamed. As of Januaray 2023, it had 19 wrestlers, with four of them ranked in the two top professional divisions.



In July 2005, Satsuki, a sandanme wrestler encountered a fire in Aichi Prefecture during the Nagoya tournament, used a ladder to rescue a woman on the second floor. He left the scene without telling his name, but later received a letter of appreciation from the Aichi Konan Fire Department. In June 2020, wrestlers from the stable saved another person while being among a group of 20 people who helped rescue a woman from drowning in a nearby river in an apparent suicide attempt. The Takenotsuka Metropolitan Police Department issued a letter of appreciation to the stable.

In April 2021, the stable's 28 year-old sandanme wrestler Hibikiryū died after he fell on his head during a tournament bout on March 26. The long hesitation of those around the dohyō before Hibikiryū finally received professional medical attention several minutes later shocked spectators and raised criticism online and in the media about sumo proceedings, which prompted the Japanese Sumo Association to study a modification of procedure.

In February 2022, Takekuma-oyakata (former ōzeki Gōeidō) broke off from the stable to establish the Takekuma stable.

Ring name conventions
Many wrestlers at this stable take ring names or shikona that begin with the characters 佐田 (read: sada), in honor of the original holder of the Sakaigawa kabu (title), yokozuna Sadanoyama.

Owner
1998–present: 13th Sakaigawa (riji, former komusubi Ryōgoku)

Notable active wrestlers

Myōgiryū (best rank sekiwake)
Sadanoumi (best rank maegashira)
Hiradoumi (best rank maegashira)
Tsushimanada (best rank jūryō)

Coaches
Sekinoto Ryūta (iin, former komusubi Iwakiyama)
Yamashina Ryūta (toshiyori, former maegashira Toyohibiki)
Furiwake Kokan (toshiyori, former maegashira Hōchiyama)
Dekiyama Akihoro (toshiyori, former maegashira Sadanofuji)

Notable past wrestlers
Gōeidō (former ōzeki)
Iwakiyama (former komusubi)
Sadanofuji (former maegashira)
Hōchiyama (former maegashira)
Toyohibiki (former maegashira)

Usher
Yūji (jonidan yobidashi, real name Yūki Tabata)

Hairdresser
Tokoryū (3rd class tokoyama)
Tokoteru (4th class tokoyama'')

Location and access
Tokyo, Adachi ward, Toneri 4-3-1

See also
List of sumo stables
List of active sumo wrestlers
List of past sumo wrestlers
Glossary of sumo terms

References

External links
Official site 
Japan Sumo Association profile

Active sumo stables